The Fuhrmann triangle, named after Wilhelm Fuhrmann (1833–1904), is special triangle based on a given arbitrary triangle.

Those midpoints get reflected at the associated triangle sides yielding the points , which forms the Fuhrmann triangle.

The circumcircle of Fuhrmann triangle is the Fuhrmann circle. For the area of the Fuhrmann triangle the following formula holds:

Where  denotes the circumcenter of the given triangle  and   its radius as well as  denoting the incenter and  its radius. Due to Euler's theorem one also has  . The following equations hold for the sides of the Fuhrmann triangle:

Where  denote the sides of the given triangle  and  the sides of the Fuhrmann triangle (see drawing).

References 

Objects defined for a triangle